Roberto Risso (22 November 1925 – 16 November 2010) was a Swiss-born Italian film actor.

Life and career 
Born Pietro Roberto Strub in Geneva, Risso joined the cinema industry when he was still a university student of architecture, playing a minor role in Pietro Francisci's The Lion of Amalfi (1950).   One year later he was chosen to play the seducer of Pier Angeli in Tomorrow Is Another Day, and the success of the film allowed him to play similar roles in a large number of films, mainly romantic comedies. In 1953 Risso touched the peak of his career with the role of the shy Carabiniere Pietro Stelluti madly in love with Gina Lollobrigida  in Luigi Comencini's Bread, Love and Dreams, a role that he reprised in the film sequel Bread, Love and Jealousy. Later his career continued in many films in which he appeared mostly in character roles, until his retirement in 1968.

Selected filmography

 The Lion of Amalfi (1950)
 Tomorrow Is Another Day (1951) - Paolo
 The Black Captain (1951) - Paolo Adinolfi
 Revenge of the Pirates (1951) - Miguel
 The Seven Dwarfs to the Rescue (1951) - Prince Charming
 Operation Mitra (1951) - Marco Fornari
 La voce del sangue (1952) - Sergio Scala
 Rosalba, la fanciulla di Pompei (1952) - Giorgio de Montera
 Three Forbidden Stories (1952) - Bernardo (First segment)
 Finishing School (1952) - Steve
 La figlia del diavolo (1952) - Roberto
 Nessuno ha tradito (1952) - Bruno
 I Piombi di Venezia (1953) - Il Tintoretto
 Francis the Smuggler (1953) - Davide
 La valigia dei sogni (1953) - Giorgio Astori
 Bread, Love and Dreams (1953) - Carabiniere Stelluti
 Tormento d'anime (1953) - Michele
 Sua altezza ha detto: no! (1953) - Giorgio Rovere
 Il bacio dell'Aurora (1953)
 Balocchi e profumi (1953) - Raimundo Muzzi
 Angels of Darkness (1954) - Bruno
 The Desperate Women (1954) - Jimmy
 Bread, Love and Jealousy (1954) - Carabiniere Stelluti
 One Step to Eternity (1954) - Mario Mirador, l'amant de Véra
 Le signorine dello 04 (1955) - Carlo Conti
 La moglie è uguale per tutti (1955) - Michele
 Il campanile d'oro (1955) - Pasquale
 Songs of Italy (1955)
 Accadde di notte (1956)
 Paris, Palace Hotel (1956) - Gérard Necker dit Brugnon
 The Rival (1956) - Tenente Ugo Perelli
 Una pelliccia di visone (1957) - Franco
 Si le roi savait ça (1958) - Pascal
 Adorabili e bugiarde (1958) - Gino Gorni
 Angel in a Taxi (1958) - Filippo
 Tuppe tuppe, Marescià! (1958) - Maresciallo Pietro Stelluti
 Te doy mi vida (1958)
 Sergente d'ispezione (1958) - Bacci
 L'ultima canzone (1958)
 Caterina Sforza, la leonessa di Romagna (1959) - Giovanni de Medici dalle Bande Nere
 Il raccomandato di ferro (1959)
 A Breath of Scandal (1960) - Aide de camp
 Call Girls of Rome (1960) - Carlo Malpighi
 A Qualcuna Piace Calvo (1960) - Renato Salustri
 Cocagne (1961) - Vincente
 Un figlio d'oggi (1961) - Raul
 The Valiant (1962) - Emilio Bianchi
 Gladiator of Rome (1962) - Valerio jr.
 The Fury of Achilles (1962) - Paris
 The Captive City (1962) - Loveday
 Zorro and the Three Musketeers (1963) - Aramis
 The Shortest Day (1963) - Soldato austriaco (uncredited)
 Rocambole (1963)
 Revenge of the Musketeers (1963) - Aramis
 Hate Thy Neighbor (1968) - Duke (final film role)

References

External links 

1925 births
2010 deaths
Actors from Geneva
Italian male film actors
20th-century Italian male actors